Sanmatenga is one of the 45 provinces of Burkina Faso, located in its Centre-Nord Region.

Its capital is Kaya.

Departments
Sanmatenga is divided into 10 departments:
Barsalogho Department
Boussouma Department
Dablo Department
Kaya Department
Korsimoro Department
Mané Department
Namissiguima Department
Pensa Department
Pibaoré Department
Pissila Department
Ziga Department

See also
Regions of Burkina Faso
Provinces of Burkina Faso
Departments of Burkina Faso
September 2019 Sanmatenga attacks

References

 
Provinces of Burkina Faso